Chelyuskinets is a rural locality (a khutor) in Pichuzhinskoye Rural Settlement, Dubovsky District, Volgograd Oblast, Russia. The population was 347 as of 2010. There are 12 streets.

Geography 
Chelyuskinets is located in steppe, on the Pichuga River, 20 km northeast of Dubovka (the district's administrative centre) by road. Pichuga is the nearest rural locality.

References 

Rural localities in Dubovsky District, Volgograd Oblast